Udvarhely was an administrative county (comitatus) of the Kingdom of Hungary. Its territory is now in central Romania (eastern Transylvania). The capital of the county was Székelyudvarhely (now Odorheiu Secuiesc).

Geography

Udvarhely county shared borders with the counties of Maros-Torda, Csík, Háromszék, Nagy-Küküllő, and Kis-Küküllő. The county lay in the Carpathian Mountains. Its area was 2,938 km2 around 1910.

History
Udvarhely county consisted of three former seats of the Székelys: Udvarhelyszék, Bardóc and Keresztúr (the latter two as filial seats of the former). It was formed in 1876, when the administrative structure of Transylvania was changed. In 1920, by the Treaty of Trianon, the county became part of Romania until 1940 when, by the Second Vienna Award, much of its territory was reassigned to Hungary. After the end of World War II it became again part of Romania. Most of its territory lies in the present-day Romanian county of Harghita, with small parts in Mureș (a small part in the west) and Covasna (a small part in the south-east).

Demographics

Subdivisions

In the early 20th century, the subdivisions of Udvarhely county were:

Notes

References 

States and territories established in 1940
States and territories disestablished in 1920
States and territories disestablished in 1945
Kingdom of Hungary counties in Transylvania